James & Michael Younger, also known as The Younger Brothers, were an American country music group from Edinburg, Texas composed of brothers James and Michael Williams.

History
Their eponymous debut album was released in 1983 by MCA Records. Its first single, "Nothing but the Radio On," reached the Top 20 on the Billboard Hot Country Singles chart in 1982. An uncredited review in The Philadelphia Inquirer gave the duo's album a two-star rating, praising their vocal harmonies but criticizing the lack of variety in tempo. After exiting MCA, the duo recorded a number of singles for the Permian and AIR labels, then disbanded in 1986.

Discography

Albums

Singles

References

External links
[ James & Michael Younger] at Allmusic

Country music groups from Texas
Country music duos
Sibling musical duos
MCA Records artists
Musical groups established in 1982
Musical groups disestablished in 1986
1982 establishments in Texas